Lil' Pimp is a 2005 American adult animated black comedy film directed and written by Mark Brooks and Peter Gilstrap and based upon an episodic web animation by the same name. Originally planned as a theatrical release through Columbia Pictures, the film was released straight to DVD on January 11, 2005 by Lions Gate Home Entertainment, and starred Lil' Kim and Bernie Mac as voice artists.

Plot
A little redhead, freckled 9-year-old boy (whose name is not mentioned during the movie, but is revealed in the very end of the movie, as well as in the credits, to be Lil' Pimp) is unable to adapt to suburban life, as his only friend is a foul mouthed gerbil and faces constant rejection by his peers. He accidentally meets a prostitute under the name of Sweet Chiffon, who takes him to her working place, a bar named "the Playground", where he befriends the pimp "Fruit Juice", who gives him a small amount of "pimp glitter". He decides he wants to become a pimp.

The following day at school, during show and tell he is scorned by his classmates for not having a living male relative and decides to use the pimp glitter to summon Fruit Juice, who consequently impresses the whole class. When he visits the Playground again, Fruit Juice alters the boy's style and dresses him as a pimp, too. Meanwhile, mayor Tony Gold threatens to close Fruit Juice's bar, unless he is given 90% of the profits. After this incident the boy's mother goes in search of him, first directed to a gay bar and informed by Sweet Chiffon of a "nasty midget" closely resembling her son and then to the Playground. The boy refuses to return home to his mother, of which mayor Tony is informed directly and takes advantage, accusing Fruit Juice of keeping the boy against his will.  He is promptly arrested and his bar is closed down. Afterwards, mayor Tony Gold kidnaps Fruit Juice's prostitutes, in order to exploit them, while assigning two policemen to plant a bomb in the closed Playground.

Meanwhile, Fruit Juice believes that the boy betrayed him, but upon being visited and helped to escape by the boy, he changes his attitude towards him. After the narrow escape, the boy's friends meet secretly in his room in order to concoct a plan to foil the Mayor's scheme. His mother discovers them and agrees to disguise herself as a prostitute in order to lure the two policemen into giving her the keys to the Town Hall. The boy and his friends enter the Town Hall secretly and unveil mayor Tony's wide range of crimes, while the boy sets the prostitutes free. Then, after the gang moves the explosives, mayor Tony, unaware of the situation, presses the button on the remote controlling the bomb, devouring the Town Hall.

In the end, Fruit Juice turns his bar into a theme park also named "the Playground" but less sexually explicit. Mayor Tony and the two policemen are then shown to be working at the park as costumed mascots.

Cast
 Mark Brooks as Lil' Pimp
 Bernie Mac as Fruit Juice
 Lil' Kim as Sweet Chiffon
 Ludacris as Weathers
 William Shatner as Tony Gold 
 Danny Bonaduce as Nasty Midget
 Kevin Michael Richardson as Smokey
 Jill Talley as Mom/Old lady/Mary
 David Spade as Principal Nixon
 Peter Gilstrap as Skinny Peeps/Kevin/Bonny
 Big Boy as Nag Champa
 John C. McGinley as Man Cub Master
 Mystikal as Geoffrey
 Jack Shih as Cabbie
 Jennifer Tilly as Miss De La Croix
 Carmen Electra as Honeysack
 Tom Kenny as Hans Dribbler Announcer/Billy/Clancey/Adam 12 Cop

Reception
In their negative review for the DVD, DVD Verdict commented that several people had walked out of the 2003 test screenings held by Sony (who had initially held the rights to the film) and that they (the reviewer) recommended that people stay away from the 2005 DVD release. In contrast, the Metro Times gave a positive review for the DVD, stating "In a perfect world, this would’ve came out with an accompanying sound track and DVD extras like the 48 “Webisodic” episodes, but as a stand-alone item, Lil Pimp works its odd little corner of the world nicely."

References

External links 
 

2005 films
American black comedy films
2005 animated films
American adult animated films
American animated comedy films
American independent films
Direct-to-video animated films
Direct-to-video comedy films
Films about prostitution in the United States
Lionsgate animated films
American flash animated films
2000s English-language films
2000s American films